Kavi Sammelan is a gathering of poets in the Hindi Belt of northern India. The participants recite their poetry to each other and have a general discussion on literary issues. This may take place among the poets but is mostly done before an audience. Kavi sammelan specifically dedicated to comedy (Hāsya) and satire ("Vyangya") are known Hasya Kavi Sammelan.

History

The first grand kavi sammelan was organized in the year 1920, which included many poets and large audiences. After that, kavi sammelan became a large part of Indian culture. The Mushaira of Urdu poetry and the Hindi Kavi Sammelan are now often combined, and 'Mushaira-cum-Kavi Sammelan' is organised throughout the Hindustani speaking world.

In India, the period from Indian independence in 1947 to the early 1980s was a golden phase for kavi sammelan. From the mid-1980s up to the late 1990s, the Indian population, and especially its youth, was suffering from issues such as unemployment. This took its toll on kavi sammelan, as did newer modes of entertainment such as television and the internet, as well as the quantity of Indian cinema releases. Kavi sammelans had started losing their standing in Indian culture, both in terms of quantity and quality.

In the era before economic liberalization(1991), kavi sammelans were a popular part of everyday life. They were often broadcast on the state-owned Doordarshan TV network. Post-liberalization, with increasing westernization and proliferation of electronic media, the frequency of such gatherings has reduced. One good trend that has been observed in Kavi-Sammelan is that, it has taken its roots in other countries too. With its increasing frequency across the globe. Moreover, now many Indian television channels giving airtime to programmes based on Hindi poetry recitations like Wah! Wah! Kya Baat Hai!, Kavi-Sammelan have got a fresh breath of life with increased audience base and liking.

Indian and International Organizers
Hindi Kavi sammelans are organized across the globe. The US, Dubai, Muscat, Singapore, UK are the places that organize highest number of kavi sammelans after India. In most of the kavi sammelans organized in these countries, the poets are generally invited from India.

List of Famous Kavi Sammelan Poets  

Mayank Mishra 
Rajkavi Inderjeet Singh Tulsi
Pankaj Prasun
Arun Gemini
Ashok Chakradhar
Surendar Sharma
Chirag Jain
Devesh Mishra
Samapt Saral
Shambhu Shikhar

References

Indian poetry
Hindi poetry
Hindi words and phrases
Poetry festivals in India